Moses Van Campen House is a historic home located at Angelica in Allegany County, New York. It is a -story, L-shaped brick and frame house with a 2-story addition.  It was built around 1809 by Moses Van Campen (1757–1849) and is on a  property. Van Campen was a Revolutionary War veteran, Indian fighter, and surveyor. He served as judge and justice of peace, and as Allegany county treasurer.  It is acknowledged as the first brick structure in the area and one of the earliest extant structures along this road.  The road was laid out in 1810 by Van Campen as the original Bath-Olean Turnpike.

It was listed on the National Register of Historic Places in 2004.

References

External links

"Moses Van Campen...In Tribute" (www.MosesVanCampen.com)
A Glimpse of Moses Van Campen
Van Campen, Moses, House - Angelica, NY - U.S. National Register of Historic Places on Waymarking.com

Houses on the National Register of Historic Places in New York (state)
Federal architecture in New York (state)
Houses in Allegany County, New York
National Register of Historic Places in Allegany County, New York